Montaigut-le-Blanc is a commune in the Creuse department in the Nouvelle-Aquitaine region in central France.

Geography
The commune is served by a TER railway station at the nearby hamlet of La Neuville.

Population

Sights
 The church, dating from the thirteenth century.
 The restored fifteenth-century castle.
 An eighteenth-century chapel.

See also
Communes of the Creuse department

References

Communes of Creuse